Ranuccio II Farnese (17 September, 1630 – 11 December, 1694) was the sixth Duke of Parma and Piacenza from 1646 until his death nearly 50 years later and Duke of Castro from 1646 until 1649.

Biography

Birth and Succession
Ranuccio was the eldest son of Odoardo Farnese, the fifth sovereign duke of Parma, and his Tuscan wife, Margherita de' Medici. After his father's sudden death, Ranuccio succeeded as duke. As he was a minor and had not yet reached his majority, he ruled the first two years of his reign under the regency of his uncle, Francesco Maria Farnese and his mother.

Ranuccio belonged to the House of Farnese, whose duchy were founded by his patrilineal ancestor, Pope Paul III, formerly Alessandro Farnese. The Farnese Dukes had been ruling Parma and Piacenza since Pope Paul's illegitimate son Pier Luigi Farnese was given it as a possession. Pier Luigi was also Duke of Castro, a title he was bestowed upon by his father, after the latter created it from the lands recovered after the death of Ranuccio the Elder, Pier Luigi's younger brother.

Conflicts with the Papacy

During Odoardo's reign the declining Duchy had been involved in the Wars of Castro, over the above-mentioned duchy of Castro, which was a Farnese fief in the Papal States, north of Rome, which the powerful Pope Urban VIII's family, the Barberini, was eager to acquire. They found the excuse when Odoardo was unable to repay his creditors, from whom he had incurred debts. Urban responded to the creditors' plea for help and had Castro occupied. However, the first war ended with Papal defeat.

Ranuccio refused to repay the debts incurred by his father, despite the latter having a signed  peace treaty agreeing to do so. He also refused to recognize the new bishop of Castro, appointed by Urban's successor, Innocent X. In 1649, the new bishop, Cardinal Cristoforo Giarda, was murdered on his way to Castro. Innocent accused Ranuccio of the murder and in retaliation, forces loyal to the Pope besieged Castro, and then razed it to the ground. In August of that same year, the Parmense troops had been crushed not far from Bologna, and Ranuccio remained with no means to gain back his fief, despite his attempts to buy it back with money.

In 1672 he bought the principate of Bardi and Compiano from Gianandrea Doria Landi, giving the Duchy its final shape.
In the last days of his reign, the Duchy suffered heavily from the presence of Imperial troops, who were fighting in the dispute between Victor Amadeus II of Savoy and France.

Family

Ranuccio II was married three times:

On 29 April 1660, Ranuccio married firstly Marguerite Yolande of Savoy (b. 15 November 1635 – d. 29 April 1663), a daughter of Victor Amadeus I, Duke of Savoy and Christine Marie of France. They had two children:

On 18 February 1664 Ranuccio married secondly Isabella d'Este of Modena (b. 3 October 1635 – d. 17 August 1666), a daughter of Francesco I d'Este and his cousin. They had three children:

 
On 1 January 1668 he married Maria d'Este of Modena, (b. 8 December 1644 – d. 20 August 1684), his second wife's sister. They had nine children:

Ancestry

References

https://web.archive.org/web/20050204142743/http://www.comune.piacenza.it/english/history/Ifarnese.htm (Retrieved January 23, 2005)
http://www.italycyberguide.com/History/factspersons/wxyz.htm (Retrieved January 23, 2005)
http://page.freett.com/mako_vl/name/hausf.html (Retrieved January 23, 2005)

Ranuccio
Ranuccio
17th-century Italian nobility
Ranuccio
1630 births
1694 deaths
Burials at the Sanctuary of Santa Maria della Steccata